Megan Blanksma (born in Nampa, Idaho) is an American politician serving as a member of the Idaho House of Representatives from District 23 in seat B. Blanksma currently serves as the Majority Leader for the House of Representatives.

Early life and education
Blanksma was born and raised in Nampa. She graduated from Nampa High School and served as a legislative page in the Idaho Senate during her senior year. Later, she earned a Bachelor of Science in economics from the University of Idaho.

Career 
From 2014 to 2016, Blanksma served as Chair of the Elmore County Republican Party, after many years as a volunteer in many capacities at the county and state level. She also serves on the St. Luke's Elmore Community Board.

Idaho House of Representatives
Blanksma challenged 14-year incumbent Pete Nielsen in the Republican primary in 2016. She was endorsed by Governor Butch Otter.  After securing the nomination, Blanksma faced only independent and third party opposition in the general election and was elected to the seat.

Committee assignments
Heath and Welfare Committee
Local Government Committee
Resources and Conservation Committee

Personal life 
Blanksma and her husband, Jeff, live on a farm in Hammett, Idaho.

Elections

References

21st-century American politicians
21st-century American women politicians
Idaho Republicans
Living people
People from Elmore County, Idaho
People from Nampa, Idaho
University of Idaho alumni
Women state legislators in Idaho
Year of birth missing (living people)